Caltech Peak is a 13,832-foot-elevation (4,216 meter) mountain summit located in Sequoia National Park  in Tulare County, California. It is situated one mile west of the crest of the Sierra Nevada mountain range, just one-half mile south of the Kings–Kern Divide, one mile south of line parent Mount Stanford, and 9.3 miles northwest of Mount Whitney. Caltech Peak ranks as the 24th-highest summit in California. The John Muir Trail traverses below the east aspect of the mountain, providing an approach option for climbers.

History
The first ascent of the summit was made June 22, 1926, by Norman Clyde, who is credited with 130 first ascents, most of which were in the Sierra Nevada.

This mountain's toponym was officially adopted in 1961 by the U.S. Board on Geographic Names to commemorate California Institute of Technology (Caltech).

Climate
Caltech Peak is located in an alpine climate zone. Most weather fronts originate in the Pacific Ocean, and travel east toward the Sierra Nevada mountains. As fronts approach, they are forced upward by the peaks (orographic lift), causing them to drop their moisture in the form of rain or snowfall onto the range. Precipitation runoff from this mountain drains into headwaters of the Kern River.

See also
 
 List of the major 4000-meter summits of California

References

External links
 Weather forecast: Caltech Peak
 Caltech Peak: caltech.edu

Mountains of Tulare County, California
Mountains of Sequoia National Park
North American 4000 m summits
Mountains of Northern California
Sierra Nevada (United States)